Animal House is the first album by German heavy metal band U.D.O., following Udo Dirkschneider's departure from Accept. It was recorded from August to October 1987 at Dierks Studios in Cologne. Released in 1987, it charted at No. 41 in Sweden.

The performance of the song "Lay Down the Law" is credited to Accept and U.D.O. The 'Pulheimer Kinder- und Jugendchor' contribute vocals to "They Want War".

In some releases of the album, a picture of the tour band including Dieter Rubach and Andy Susemihl was shown in the booklet. The album cover shows the line-up that recorded the album. An "Animal House" tour followed in early 1988. During this time they also toured with Guns N' Roses, Lita Ford and Zodiac Mindwarp. After Rubach left the band, they supported Ozzy Osbourne on all European dates in 1989.

The album was reissued in 2013 by AFM Records with bonus tracks.

Track listings

Personnel
Udo Dirkschneider – vocals
Mathias Dieth – guitars
Peter Szigeti – guitars
Frank Rittel – bass
Thomas Franke – drums

Production
Produced and engineered by Mark Dodson
Mixed by Mark Dodson and Gerd Rautenbauch
Assistant engineers: Uli Baronowsky, Thomas P. Sehringer
Recorded and mixed August–October 1987 at Dierks Studios, Cologne
Mastering at Sterling Sound Studios, New York
Cover idea, concept and realization: Peek-A-Boo (Donald Campbell, Nico Chiraiatti)
Cover photo: Akzent Studios
Anniversary Edition design: Tim Eckhorst

References

1987 debut albums
U.D.O. albums
Albums produced by Mark Dodson
RCA Records albums